Back to Bedlam is the debut studio album by the English singer-songwriter James Blunt, released on 11 October 2004 by Custard and Atlantic Records. It is named after the famous psychiatric institution of Bethlem Royal Hospital, which is commonly known as Bedlam.

Initially lingering in the lower regions of the UK Albums Chart in its first few months of release, it became a major worldwide success after its third single, "You're Beautiful", became a worldwide hit in the summer of 2005. Back to Bedlam would go on to become the highest-selling album of 2005 in the UK, with over 2.4 million copies sold. By December 2009, the album had been certified 10× Platinum by the British Phonographic Industry for sales of over 3 million, making it the best-selling album of the 2000s in the UK. In 2011, it was overtaken by Amy Winehouse's Back to Black as the best-selling album of the 21st century in the UK. Back to Bedlam currently ranks as the 18th best-selling album in UK chart history and the biggest selling debut album by a British artist. As of 2017, it has sold 3.33 million copies in the UK and over 11 million copies worldwide.

Background and recording
Blunt had piano and violin lessons as a child, but his first significant exposure to popular music was at Harrow School. There, he was introduced to the guitar by a fellow student, and started playing the instrument and writing songs at age 14. At University of Bristol, his undergraduate thesis was The Commodification of Image – Production of a Pop Idol; one of his main references for the thesis was sociologist and rock critic, Simon Frith, chairman of the Mercury Music Prize panel of judges since 1992.

Because the British Army sponsored his university education, Blunt was obliged to serve a minimum of four years in the armed forces. He stated on an interview in his Back to Bedlam sessions that he chose to join the military as his father was "pushing for it, so that [Blunt] could obtain a secure work placement and income". Blunt trained at the Royal Military Academy Sandhurst. While still in the army, he worked on demos during his time off. A backing vocalist and songwriting collaborator suggested he contact Elton John's manager Todd Interland, with whom she used to share a house. Interland told HitQuarters that he listened to Blunt's demo while driving home and after hearing the track "Goodbye My Lover", pulled over and called the mobile number written on the CD to set up a meeting.

Blunt left the British Army in 2002 so that he could pursue his musical career. It was at that period that he started using the stage name "Blunt", in part to make it easier for others to spell; "Blount" is pronounced the same way, and remains his legal surname. Shortly after leaving the army, he was signed to EMI music publishers and Twenty-First Artists management. A record contract remained elusive, with label executives pointing to Blunt's posh speaking voice as a barrier in class-divided Britain. Linda Perry, who was just launching her own label Custard Records in early 2003, heard Blunt's promotional tape when visiting London, and soon after heard him perform live at the South by Southwest Music Festival. She made an offer to him the same night and within a few days, Blunt signed a recording contract with Perry, and one month later he was in Los Angeles working with producer Tom Rothrock.

Blunt recorded Back to Bedlam in 2003 with producer Tom Rothrock at Rothrock's home studio, using session musicians and performing on many different instruments himself. While in Los Angeles, he lodged with actress Carrie Fisher, whom he had met through the family of a former girlfriend. Fisher was very supportive of Blunt's aspirations, suggesting the name of the album and providing use of a bathroom in her home for Blunt to record the song "Goodbye My Lover".

Critical reception

AllMusic felt "...the Soulful British crooner James Blunt's wistful debut infuses the listener – in order – with rainy-day hope, the wistful comfort of unattainable love, and finally, world-weary resignation. While his parched and effeminate falsetto recalls Gasoline Alley-era Rod Stewart with a healthy dose of Antony and the Johnsons, it's the late Elliott Smith who casts the largest shadow on Back to Bedlam." Q magazine and Common Sense Media awarded the album four stars out of five. RocknWorld stated "It's hard to describe James Blunt or his music without falling prey to many a cliché or hyperbole. Comes from the UK, serves in the army then makes an album of movingly sincere ballads which make a huge impression on his homeland and Australia, thus allowing him to enjoy phenomenal, chart topping success. However, in this case, the music Blunt is making does really deserve and warrant the hype surrounding him. Strangely enough, even with his music being all over the radio here in Australia, I cannot begrudge the fact that Blunt is truly talented and has made himself a damn good debut record." BBC Collective said "It's very rare I give an album 5 stars. Many have come close, but just missing it. I never thought i would say this, but Back To Bedlam has not got one bad track on it. I've listened to it 3 times back to back, just to make sure." Slant Magazine said, in a three and a half star review, that "Bedlam is an overall raw listening experience" and that though "Blunt's writing often juxtaposes love with death" that it's "More reason for American girls to go gaga over this able British bloke."

Indie London praised the album, and went on to call it "...a masterful debut and one which you mustn't allow to pass you by." In a 4 star review, About.com said that "To aptly describe James Blunt's music in his debut album Back to Bedlam, it would be an injustice to ignore the backdrop of his past and its relation to his music – in fact it's impossible to do so" and gave praise to the songs which they called "Hauntingly captivating, his words paint the pictures of many stories lived, masterly recited through his songs. Back to Bedlam seems not so much a pop compilation as it does a reflection of a life through the art of music." Nate Murray of Relevant gave a similar review, and compared his work to the likes of Elliott Smith, calling it "endearingly honest" and continued "...like any great writer, he invites the reader, or in this case, the listener, into the intimate details of life that resonate with most anyone. Combine such candid writing with a voice one interviewer has called 'disgustingly gorgeous', and you have a recipe for musical addiction. Blunt's talents have earned the endorsement of Elton John and led to comparisons with John’s early work, as well as the late Elliott Smith."

Track listing

Personnel
James Blunt – lead vocals on all tracks; guitars on tracks 1, 5, 6 and 9; organ on tracks 3, 4, 6 and 9; piano on tracks 1, 4, 5 and 10; Wurlitzer electric piano on tracks 5, 6 and 7; acoustic guitar on tracks 2 and 7; Rhodes piano on tracks 3 and 4; keyboards and marimba on track 1; classical guitar on track 3; twelve-string guitar on track 4; church organ on track 5; backing vocals on track 6; grand piano on track 8; mellotron on track 9
Sasha Krivtsov – bass on all tracks except 4, 7 and 10; backing vocals on track 6
Charlie Paxson – drums on all tracks except 10; backing vocals on track 6 (credited as Charlie Paxton)
John Nau – Hammond organ on tracks 3, 5, 6, 7 and 8; Wurlitzer electric piano on tracks 1, 3, 8 and 9; piano on track 2; guitar sustain on track 4; backing vocals on track 6; tack piano on track 8
Eric Gorfain – strings on track 2, 4 and 5
Richard Dodd - strings on track 2, 4, and 5
The Section Quartet – strings on tracks 2, 4 and 5
John "Gumby" Goodwin – electric guitar on track 3; backing vocals on track 6; slide guitar solo on track 7
Matt Chait – guitar sample on track 4; electric guitar on track 7; guitar on track 8
Jimmy Hogarth – acoustic guitar and keyboards on track 3
Sacha Skarbek – Rhodes piano on track 3
Amanda Ghost – backing vocals on track 3
Guy Chambers – guitar feedback on track 5
Tom Rothrock – backing vocals on track 6
W. Vincent – bass on track 8
The Producer – slide guitar on track 9
Linda Perry – guitar and production on track 10
P. III – bass on track 10
Brian McCloud – drums on track 10
Tom Rothrock – production, mixing
Mike Tarantino – engineering; lead guitar on track 1; electric guitar on track 2; Mississippi guitar on track 7
David Guerrero – engineering on track 10
John Morrical – engineering assistance
Andrew Chavez – engineering assistance on track 10
Don Tyler – mastering

Charts

Weekly charts

Year-end charts

Decade-end charts

Certifications and sales

Use in media
Eight of the ten songs on Back to Bedlam were licensed for use in television shows, movies, advertising campaigns and trailers, a total of 34 times. This included "Tears and Rain", "So Long Jimmy" and "Cry", tracks that had not been released as singles.

See also
 List of best-selling albums in the United Kingdom
 List of best-selling albums of the 2000s in Australia
 List of best-selling albums of the 2000s (decade) in the United Kingdom
 List of best-selling albums of the 2000s (century) in the United Kingdom

References

External links
 Back to Bedlam

2004 debut albums
James Blunt albums
Atlantic Records albums
Albums produced by Tom Rothrock
Albums produced by Linda Perry
Custard Records albums
Albums recorded in a home studio